The Blue Earth County Courthouse is the courthouse of Blue Earth County, Minnesota, United States, in the city of Mankato, the county seat. It is listed on the National Register of Historic Places.

History

The building, completed in 1889, was the second courthouse in the county.  The first courthouse in the county, a 20-by-24 foot one-story stone building, was built in 1857.

According to local Welsh-language poet James D. Price, whose Bardic name was "Ap Dewi", the first Eisteddfod held in Mankato took place at the Blue Earth County Courthouse on January 1, 1873.

By the mid 1800s, the county commissioners felt that the previous buildings were a "disgrace and gave strangers that we were behind the times.  That the county was either poverty stricken or greatly lacking in enterprise."  At this time, there was a debate on whether to relocate the county seat to Garden City or have it remain in Mankato. 

After much debate, a building was started in 1886. The new building, designed by Minneapolis architects Haley & Allen, combined a Second Empire roof and dome with Italianate features.  The stone was provided by a local quarry, with various techniques giving it both rusticated and ashlar surfaces.  The copper-sheathed dome is capped with a statue of Lady Justice.

References

External links

Blue Earth County web site

Buildings and structures in Blue Earth County, Minnesota
Clock towers in Minnesota
County courthouses in Minnesota
Courthouses on the National Register of Historic Places in Minnesota
Italianate architecture in Minnesota
Mankato, Minnesota
National Register of Historic Places in Blue Earth County, Minnesota
Welsh-American culture in Minnesota
1889 establishments in Minnesota